Mwimbi Papy Abedi (born June 30, 1978) is a Congolese-Swedish mixed martial artist who last competed in 2017. A professional competitor since 2006, he formerly fought for the UFC.

Biography
Abedi was born in 1978 in Kinshasa, Zaire (now Democratic Republic of the Congo), where he grew up. He was given the nickname "Makambo" by the elders, which in Lingala means "trouble", because whenever there was a fight or trouble, he was the first at the scene.  He later moved to France and Belgium, before moving to Sweden in 1997. He started training in judo at 7 years of age.

Mixed martial arts career
Abedi made his professional MMA debut in December 2006.  He produced finishes in all but one of his fights, including five knockouts and two submissions.At this point of his career multiple major MMA media outlets described him as one of the best middleweights in the European circuit and predicted that he had potential for a great future in MMA.

Ultimate Fighting Championship
In June 2011, Papy signed a four-fight deal with the Ultimate Fighting Championship, and it was announced that he would drop down to welterweight for his UFC debut.

Abedi made his UFC debut against former title challenger Thiago Alves on November 5, 2011 at UFC 138.  Abedi was badly hurt by a straight right hand from Alves that knocked him down midway through the first round and after delivering a barrage of punches and elbows that cut Abedi open, Alves took Abedi's back and finished the fight via submission due to a rear naked choke, giving Abedi his first professional loss. Although Abedi was given credit for stepping up against a top 10-fighter in his UFC debut.

Abedi faced James Head on April 14, 2012 at UFC on Fuel TV: Gustafsson vs. Silva. Late in the opening round Head stunned Abedi with a short elbow from the clinch followed by a barrage of punches that knocked Abedi down, Head followed Papy to the mat and finished the fight with a rear naked choke.

Abedi was briefly linked to a bout with Rick Story on June 22, 2012 at UFC on FX: Maynard vs. Guida, replacing an injured Rich Attonito  However, Abedi was forced out of the bout with an injury and replaced by promotional newcomer Brock Jardine.

In his third fight with the promotion, Abedi faced fellow Swedish fighter Besam Yousef at UFC on Fuel TV 9. He won the back-and-forth fight via split decision, earning his first UFC win.

Abedi next faced Dylan Andrews in his return to middleweight on August 28, 2013 at UFC Fight Night 27. Despite controlling and winning the first two rounds, Abedi lost via knockout in the third round. After the loss Abedi was subsequently released from the UFC.

Post UFC
After his run in the UFC, Abedi went back to fight in Sweden. He was expected to face Daniel Acácio for the Superior Challenge welterweight title on May 3, 2014 at Superior Challenge 10, but pulled out with an injury and was subsequently replaced by Alan Carlos.

Abedi made his return, first expected at April 9, 2016 but later postponed, from what was an over three-year layoff, to face Bruno Carvalho in a middleweight bout on October 8, 2016 at Superior Challenge 14. He won the fight by TKO in the first round.

He faced Dylan Andrews, in a rematch of their 2013 UFC-bout, for the Superior Challenge Middleweight Championship on April 1, 2017 at Superior Challenge 15.  He lost the fight by knockout via head kick in the 2nd round.

Mixed martial arts record

|Loss
|align=center|10–4
|Dylan Andrews
|KO (head kick)
|Superior Challenge 15
|
|align=center|2
|align=center|4:16
|Stockholm, Sweden
|
|-
|Win
|align=center|10–3
|Bruno Carvalho
|TKO (punches)
|Superior Challenge 14
|
|align=center|1
|align=center|4:01
|Stockholm, Sweden
|
|-
|Loss
|align=center|9–3
|Dylan Andrews
|KO (punches)
|UFC Fight Night: Condit vs. Kampmann 2
|
|align=center|3
|align=center|1:32
|Indianapolis, Indiana, United States
|
|-
|Win
|align=center|9–2
|Besam Yousef
|Decision (split)
|UFC on Fuel TV: Mousasi vs. Latifi
|
|align=center|3
|align=center|5:00
|Stockholm, Sweden
|
|-
|Loss
|align=center|8–2
|James Head
|Submission (rear-naked choke)
|UFC on Fuel TV: Gustafsson vs. Silva
|
|align=center|1
|align=center|4:33
|Stockholm, Sweden
|
|-
|Loss
|align=center|8–1
|Thiago Alves
|Submission (rear-naked choke)
|UFC 138
|
|align=center|1
|align=center|3:32
|Birmingham, England
|
|-
|Win
|align=center|8–0
|Nathan Schouteren
|Submission (guillotine choke)
|Superior Challenge 6
|
|align=center|1
|align=center|3:22
|Stockholm, Sweden
|
|-
|Win
|align=center|7–0
|Bohumil Lungrik
|TKO (punches)
|Hell Cage 5
|
|align=center|1
|align=center|2:53
|Prague, Czech Republic
|
|-
|Win
|align=center|6–0
|Nelton Pontes
|TKO (punches)
|Bushido Challenge 1: War of the Warriors
|
|align=center|1
|align=center|3:17
|Norwich, Norfolk, England
|
|-
|Win
|align=center|5–0
|Alan Carlos
|TKO (punches)
|Superior Challenge 3
|
|align=center|2
|align=center|1:56
|Stockholm, Sweden
|
|-
|Win
|align=center|4–0
|Timur Akbulut
|Submission (arm-triangle choke)
|Fight Fiesta de Luxe: Unstoppable
|
|align=center|1
|align=center|N/A
|Hollerich, Luxembourg
|
|-
|Win
|align=center|3–0
|Aldric Cassata
|TKO (knees)
|Chaos Fighting Championships 1
|
|align=center|2
|align=center|N/A
|Derry, Northern Ireland
|
|-
|Win
|align=center|2–0
|Juha Kaki
|Decision (unanimous)
|Shooto Finland: Bloodbath
|
|align=center|2
|align=center|5:00
|Vantaa, Finland
|
|-
|Win
|align=center|1–0
|Mikael Pastor
|TKO (knee to the body & punches)
|Travelfight Arena
|
|align=center|2
|align=center|2:24
|Uppsala, Sweden
|

References

External links
 
 
 Official page

1978 births
Living people
Swedish male mixed martial artists
Swedish practitioners of Brazilian jiu-jitsu
Democratic Republic of the Congo male mixed martial artists
Democratic Republic of the Congo practitioners of Brazilian jiu-jitsu
Welterweight mixed martial artists
Middleweight mixed martial artists
Mixed martial artists utilizing judo
Mixed martial artists utilizing Brazilian jiu-jitsu
Democratic Republic of the Congo male judoka
Democratic Republic of the Congo emigrants to Sweden
Sportspeople from Kinshasa
Ultimate Fighting Championship male fighters